The 1954–55 Purdue Boilermakers men's golf team represented Purdue University. The head coach was Sam Voinoff, then in his sixth season with the Boilermakers. The team was a member of the Big Ten Conference. They won the Big Ten Conference championship and finished in a tie for ninth at the NCAA championships with SMU.

Roster 
Don Albert
Joe Campbell
Wayne Etherton
Don Granger
Bob Krueger
Ed McCallum
Bill Redding
Ron Pierce
Tom Schaefer
Source

Schedule 
Tennessee W, 17-10
Vanderbilt W, 21-15
Tennessee W, 23.5-12.5
Michigan State W, 28.5-7.5
Detroit W, 30-6
Ohio State W, 26.5-9.5
Michigan L, 19-17
Indiana W, 27-9
Ohio State L, 26.5-9.5
Michigan W, 27.5-8.5
Illinois W, 30-18
Ohio State W, 20-16
Michigan W, 23.5-18.5
Indiana W, 29-9
Notre Dame W, 25-7
Illinois W, 33.5-14.5
Indiana W, 28.5-7.5
Northwestern W, 29-7
Wisconsin W, 23.5-12.5
Big Ten Championships 1st of 10
NCAA Championships T-9th of 33

Big Ten Championship results

Team Results
May 1955 in Lafayette, Indiana
1. Purdue 1,141
2. Ohio State 1,147
3. Wisconsin 1,166
4. Michigan 1,170
5. Minnesota 1,191
6. Iowa 1,192
7. Michigan State 1,204
8. Illinois 1,205
9. Northwestern 1,209
10. Indiana 1,213

Individual Results
The championship was shortened for the first time ever from 72 holes to 54 as a result of storms.

The top five player scores counted towards the championship.

References

Purdue Boilermakers men's golf seasons